Przyłęk  is a village (former city) in the administrative district of Gmina Bardo, within Ząbkowice Śląskie County, Lower Silesian Voivodeship, in south-western Poland. Prior to 1945 it was in Germany.

References

Przylek
Former populated places in Lower Silesian Voivodeship